WSGW (790 kHz) is an AM radio station licensed to Saginaw, Michigan that broadcasts with 5,000 watts of power during the day and 1,000 watts at night. WSGW is owned by Alpha Media, the nation's fourth largest owner of radio stations. The radio station features a 24-7 local news department with talk shows of local and national interest, as well as play-by-play sports broadcasts. WSGW is an affiliate of CBS News Radio, the Compass Media Networks, Premiere Networks, Westwood One, Detroit Tigers baseball, Detroit Red Wings hockey, Saginaw Spirit hockey, and the Michigan Wolverines. The station first broadcast in 1950.

WSGW has a sister station, WSGW-FM 100.5, which also has a news-talk format. The two stations simulcast WSGW's local morning programming until noon but carry different programming and sports coverage the rest of the day. The two stations identify themselves as 100.5 and 790 Newsradio WSGW.

History
WSGW's first broadcast was August 11, 1950 from their studios at Genesee and Washington Avenues on the third floor of the Mason Building in downtown Saginaw. The 6 tower directional antenna complex is near Indiantown north of M-81 east of Saginaw. The station was started by John Lord Booth, of Detroit who founded Booth American Company. In 1973 Booth built new studios at 1795 Tittabawassee Road shared with then sister station WIOG. Then in 1988 the facility was tripled in size with a major expansion. The Booth family operated the station for 45 years until 1995 when the station was sold to another Detroit area media family called Fritz Broadcasting. During the period of deregulation just prior to the turn of the century, the station changed hands several times with brief ownerships by 62nd Street Broadcasting, Citadel Communications and Wilks Broadcasting before being bought by the NextMedia in 2002. Digity acquired WSGW in 2014, which was sold to Alpha Media in 2015.

Programming
WSGW AM and FM begin the day with The Morning Team Show hosted by Charlie Rood and Program Director Dave Maurer each weekday morning from 5:30 to 9am. The AM and FM simulcast ends at 9am when 790 AM continues with local programming while 100.5 FM airs nationally syndicated shows.

Veteran broadcaster Art Lewis hosts his own talk show from 9 to 10am. The Art Lewis Show consists of interviews with local news-makers and phone calls from the public.

News director Ann Williams joins Art Lewis from 10 - 11:30am for the Listen to the Mrs. program, which holds the title of being the longest running talk show in Michigan. Topics on this show include cooking, household hints, and local dining establishments.

Farm director Terry Henne hosts Farm Service 790 from 11:30 to noon. Terry updates listeners on local weather, market conditions, and agriculture news.

Syndicated hosts Dave Ramsey and Tom Sullivan air in the afternoon, followed by a simulcast of local CBS television affiliate WNEM's 6pm newscast. At 6:30, WSGW airs a closing report of the agricultural markets, followed by local and national news features. Clark Howard and Jim Bohannon round out the evening lineup, with Coast to Coast AM overnights.

WSGW was the home for big-name syndicated personalities Rush Limbaugh and Sean Hannity throughout the 2000s. However, in January 2009, WSGW swapped programming with its FM sister station. The swap meant WSGW no longer had to interrupt their shows for sports broadcasts while still keeping top rated The Rush Limbaugh Show and The Sean Hannity Show in the market. WSGW 790 AM subsequently picked up personalities Tom Sullivan and Dennis Miller, replacing the latter with Dave Ramsey in 2015.

The station is a longtime affiliate of the Detroit Tigers, as well as the University of Michigan Wolverines and Detroit Red Wings. Local minor hockey team Saginaw Spirit and Saginaw Valley State University athletics air on sister station WSGW-FM. Conflicting games also air on 100.5 FM.

Technical
NewsRadio 790's low dial position and corresponding long wavelength, along with a complex antenna array provides a strong signal to the Tri-Cities area and eastern portions of the Thumb. Adjacent channel interference from AM 800 CKLW in Windsor, Ontario limits WSGW's signal to the south and east. On most days, WSGW can be received as far west as Grand Rapids and north along the I-75 corridor to places like West Branch and Gaylord.

WSGW's technical history can be traced back to October 1945 when Booth Radio applied for a construction permit to build a radio station licensed to Saginaw. The original construction permit called for WSGW to broadcast at 550 kHz with 1,000 watts of power from a location on Curtis Road east of US-10 (Dixie Highway) in Bridgeport, Michigan. The Federal Communications Commission denied the application. An amended construction permit was granted in April 1949 for WSGW to operate on 790 kHz with 1,000 watts of power from a site on Uncle Henry Road in Indiantown in eastern Saginaw County. In 1961 a new Gates transmitter was installed, and WSGW was granted a power increase up to 5,000 watts during the day. WSGW gained FM sister station WIOG in September 1969, broadcasting at 106.3 mHz. In 1972, the main studios for WSGW were moved from the Mason building in downtown Saginaw to Tittabawassee Road in Carrollton Township, where WSGW and its sister stations continue to broadcast.

References

External links
 Michiguide.com - WSGW History

SGW
News and talk radio stations in the United States
Radio stations established in 1950
1950 establishments in Michigan
Alpha Media radio stations